John Hugh Means (August 18, 1812September 1, 1862) was the 64th Governor of South Carolina from 1850 to 1852 and an infantry colonel in the Confederate States Army during the American Civil War. He was killed in action at the Second Battle of Manassas, one of only a handful of well-known pre-war politicians to perish during the conflict.

Early life and career
Born in the Fairfield District of South Carolina, Means was educated at Mount Zion College in Winnsboro and he graduated from South Carolina College in 1832. He became a planter and his outspoken support of States' rights led him to his election in the General Assembly. During the agitation for secession in the decade prior to the Civil War, Means was elected in 1850 as Governor of South Carolina by the General Assembly, with Lieutenant Governor Joshua John Ward. He presided over a state convention in 1852 that passed a resolution stating that South Carolina had the right to secede if the Federal government sought in any way to disturb the institution of slavery. Furthermore, Means prepared the state for war by increasing the funding of the state militia.

Civil War
Means signed the Ordinance of Secession in 1860 and enrolled in the Confederate Army, being elected to colonel of the 17th South Carolina Infantry. The regiment saw action in Virginia at the battles of Malvern Hill during the Peninsula Campaign and then at the Rappahannock Station in prelude to the Second Battle of Manassas. As a part of Longstreets corps, the 17th Regiment arrived at 11 a.m. on August 29, 1862, to repulse an attack by Pope on the Confederates' right flank. After stopping the Union forces, the Confederates counterattacked, and Means died as a result of injuries on September 1.

References

External links
SCIway Biography of John Hugh Means
NGA Biography of John Hugh Means

1812 births
1862 deaths
University of South Carolina alumni
Democratic Party governors of South Carolina
University of South Carolina trustees
Confederate States Army officers
People of South Carolina in the American Civil War
Confederate States of America military personnel killed in the American Civil War
People from Winnsboro, South Carolina
Confederate militia generals
19th-century American politicians